Aikia Aikianpoika (Finnish) or Aike Aikesson (Swedish) (1591–1671), was a Sami Shaman (noaidi) from Kuusamo near the Finnish Lappland. He was sentenced to death for witchcraft in Kuolajärvi and accused of having caused the death by drowning of a client Tobias Mordula by a curse.  The client didn't pay for his services as promised.  Rumors tells that thereafter, Aikia, who was imprisoned in Kemi, was alleged to have killed himself with witchcraft in order to avoid execution of the sentence.  Aikias case is one of the most famous trials and executions for witchcraft in Finland.  This took place during the Christianization of the Sámi people.  

He was from Kitka in Kemi. He was active as a noaidi, and as such used a Sámi drum. He was widely rumoured to be able to cause both good and evil by use of magic, and was engaged to do so by others. 

In 1670, he was paid by a farmer to give him good salmon fishing luck. This succeeded, but the farmer did not pay sufficiently as promised. When the farmer died in 1671, Aike Aikesson was reported by a parish vicar for having caused the death of the farmer by witchcraft. Aike Aikesson, not being a Christian and thereby not associating magic with Satan, freely confessed that he could master magic to the Christian authorities, who sentenced him to death for sorcery. 

He was taken to Piteå to be executed, but the execution never took place, because he died in the sleigh on the way, likely by a heart attack.

References

1591 births
1671 deaths
People executed for witchcraft
17th-century Finnish people
Finnish Sámi shamans
People in Sámi history
Witch trials in Finland
Pagan martyrs
Persecution of Sámi people